Kipling is an unincorporated community and coal town in southwestern Center Township, Guernsey County, Ohio, United States.  It lies along State Route 265.

History
The community was named after Rudyard Kipling, a British author.

References

Unincorporated communities in Guernsey County, Ohio
Coal towns in Ohio
Unincorporated communities in Ohio